The Kinner R-5 is an American five cylinder radial engine for light general and sport aircraft of the 1930s.

Design and development
The R-5 was a development of the earlier Kinner B-5, with slightly greater power and dimensions. The main change was the increase in cylinder bore from 117 mm (4.625 in) to 127 mm (5 in) and an increase in piston stroke from 133.3 mm (5.25 in) to 139.7 mm (5.5 in). This led to a corresponding increase in displacement from 7.2 liters (441 cu in) to 8.8 liters (540 cu in). The R-5 was a rough running but reliable engine. Thousands of the R-5 and its derivatives were produced, powering many World War II trainer aircraft. Its military designation was R-540.

Applications

 Fleet Finch Model R
 Howard DGA-18 
 Kinner Sportwing
 Kinner Playboy
 Meyers OTW
 N2T Tutor
 Ryan PT-22 Recruit

Variants
R-5
R-53
R-55
R-56

Specifications (Kinner R-5)

See also

References

Further reading

External links
 http://www.oldengine.org/members/diesel/Duxford/usaero4.htm

1930s aircraft piston engines
Aircraft air-cooled radial piston engines